The ITU Long Distance Duathlon World Championships is a long-distance duathlon race, held annually since 1997, except for a break in 2009 and 2010. The championships involve a continuous run-cycle-run. The distances are typically around two to three times those of the shorter ITU Duathlon World Championships, in both cases varying according to the venue; they have also varied over the years. The championships are organised by the International Triathlon Union (ITU).

For its first three years (1997–1999) and also since 2011, the championships have been held jointly with the International Powerman Association (IPA) at Zofingen, Switzerland. The Zofingen event, known as Powerman Zofingen, claims to be "The most famous and toughest duathlon in the world", and is the longest course over which the championships have been held. The event is also the final of the Powerman Duathlon World Series.

Venues

Winners

References

Duathlon competitions
Recurring sporting events established in 1997
Duathlon, Long distance
Multisports in Switzerland